Triptyq is a classical hip hop project consisting of Antoniette Costa (vocals, harp), Tara Kamangar (piano, violin), and Kevin Olusola (cello, beatboxing).  The trio has performed at the Festival del Sole and the National Academy of Recording Arts and Sciences  Headquarters. Their first single, "Mr. Right," debuted at #2 on the Classical iTunes Chart.

References

External links

American classical music groups
American hip hop groups
Musical groups established in 2012
American musical trios
Classical music trios
2012 establishments in the United States